Nikolče Noveski (born 28 April 1979) is a Macedonian former professional footballer who played as a centre-back. He spent most of his career in Germany amassing over 300 league appearances with 1. FSV Mainz 05.

Club career
Noveski was born in Bitola, SR Macedonia, SFR Yugoslavia.

He scored two goals for Mainz in 2005–06 season and is a first team player. During Mainz's 2005–06 UEFA Cup run he also played six times. 

Noveski played a big part in Mainz's ninth-place finish during the 2009–10 season as he played in 33 out of a possible 34 games. He was also a captain of Mainz's squad.

Noveski scored six own goals in the Bundesliga which made him the leading "own goal scorer" in the Bundesliga history, together with Manfred Kaltz.

International career
He made his senior debut for Macedonia in a November 2004 FIFA World Cup qualification match against the Czech Republic and has earned a total of 64 caps, scoring 5 goals making him one of the 10 most capped Macedonia players of all-time. His final international was an October 2013 World Cup qualifier against Serbia.

International goals

Scores and results list Macedonia's goal tally first.

References

External links
 
 
 Nikolče Noveski at MacedonianFootball.com

1979 births
Living people
Sportspeople from Bitola
German people of Macedonian descent
Association football central defenders
Macedonian footballers
North Macedonia international footballers
FK Pelister players
FC Hansa Rostock players
FC Erzgebirge Aue players
1. FSV Mainz 05 players
Macedonian First Football League players
Bundesliga players
2. Bundesliga players
Regionalliga players
Macedonian expatriate footballers
Expatriate footballers in Germany
Macedonian expatriate sportspeople in Germany